Anna Theologou (born 12 March 1986), is a Cypriot economist and politician serving as a member of the House of Representatives.

Early life
Anna Theologou was born in Limassol. She studied Economics and did postgraduate studies in Monetary and Finance at University of Cyprus. She conducted postgraduate studies in Energy Resource Management at the European University of Cyprus.

Career 
She was elected to the parliament in the 2016 election, for Famagusta District as a member of the Citizens' Alliance Party. She is a member of the Parliamentary Committees on Energy, Commerce, Industry and Tourism, Transport, Communications and Works, Economic and Budgetary Affairs, Development and Control of Public Expenditure, Refugees, and the Ad Hoc Parliamentary Committee on the Revision and Modernization of Parliament's Rules of Procedure.

Theologou supported the nomination of Yiorgos Lillikas for the presidential elections in 2018. However, after the electoral failure of the candidacy, she left the Citizens Alliance and became independent in the House because she disagreed with the party's decision in view of the second round of the presidential elections, for "silencing the different view".

Personal life
Anna Theologou, was crowned "Miss Carlsberg" She is a Greek Orthodox practicant and speaks English, French and Italian.

References

1986 births
Living people
People from Limassol
21st-century Cypriot women politicians
21st-century Cypriot politicians
Members of the House of Representatives (Cyprus)
University of Cyprus alumni